The 1947–48 Greek Football Cup was the sixth edition of the Greek Football Cup. The competition culminated with the Greek Cup Final, held at Leoforos Alexandras Stadium, on 20 June 1948. The match was contested by Panathinaikos and AEK Athens, with Panathinaikos winning by 2–1.

Calendar

Qualification round

First round

|-
|colspan="3" style="background-color:#D0D0D0" align=center|Central Greece/Islands Football Clubs Association

|-
|colspan="3" style="background-color:#D0D0D0" align=center|Patras/Western Greece Football Clubs Association

{{OneLegResult| Panetolikos || 0–2* | Apollon Patras }}
|-
|colspan="3" style="background-color:#D0D0D0" align=center|Euboea/Boeotia/Lamia Football Clubs Association|-
|colspan="3" style="background-color:#D0D0D0" align=center|Thessaloniki Football Clubs Association|}

*The match was suspended at the 84th minute in expense of Panetolikos while they were 3–1 in front.

Second round

|-
|colspan="3" style="background-color:#D0D0D0" align=center|Central Greece/Islands Football Clubs Association|-
|colspan="3" style="background-color:#D0D0D0" align=center|Crete Football Clubs Association|-
|colspan="3" style="background-color:#D0D0D0" align=center|Euboea/Boeotia/Lamia Football Clubs Association|}

*Replay match.

Third round

|-
|colspan="3" style="background-color:#D0D0D0" align=center|Central Greece/Islands Football Clubs Association|-
|colspan="3" style="background-color:#D0D0D0" align=center|Patras/Western Greece Football Clubs Association|-
|colspan="3" style="background-color:#D0D0D0" align=center|Crete Football Clubs Association|-
|colspan="3" style="background-color:#D0D0D0" align=center|Euboea/Boeotia/Lamia Football Clubs Association|-
|colspan="3" style="background-color:#D0D0D0" align=center|Thessaloniki Football Clubs Association|-
|colspan="3" style="background-color:#D0D0D0" align=center|Thrace/Central-Eastern Macedonia Football Clubs Association|}

*Both teams didn't came and disqualified.

Fourth round

|-
|colspan="3" style="background-color:#D0D0D0" align=center|Central Greece/Islands Football Clubs Association|-
|colspan="3" style="background-color:#D0D0D0" align=center|Patras/Western Greece Football Clubs Association|-
|colspan="3" style="background-color:#D0D0D0" align=center|Euboea/Boeotia/Lamia Football Clubs Association|-
|colspan="3" style="background-color:#D0D0D0" align=center|Thrace/Central-Eastern Macedonia Football Clubs Association|}

*Replay match.

Fifth round

|-
|colspan="5" style="background-color:#D0D0D0" align=center|Central Greece/Islands Football Clubs Association||colspan="2" rowspan="2" 

|-
|colspan="5" style="background-color:#D0D0D0" align=center|Patras/Western Greece Football Clubs Association||colspan="2" 

|-
|colspan="5" style="background-color:#D0D0D0" align=center|Thrace/Central-Eastern Macedonia Football Clubs Association||colspan="2" 
|}

*Replay match.

Sixth round

|-
|colspan="3" style="background-color:#D0D0D0" align=center|Central Greece/Islands Football Clubs Association|-
|colspan="3" style="background-color:#D0D0D0" align=center|Patras/Western Greece Football Clubs Association|-
|colspan="3" style="background-color:#D0D0D0" align=center|Crete Football Clubs Association|-
|colspan="3" style="background-color:#D0D0D0" align=center|Euboea/Boeotia/Lamia Football Clubs Association|-
|colspan="3" style="background-color:#D0D0D0" align=center|Thessaly Football Clubs Association|-
|colspan="3" style="background-color:#D0D0D0" align=center|Thessaloniki Football Clubs Association|-
|colspan="3" style="background-color:#D0D0D0" align=center|Thrace/Central-Eastern Macedonia Football Clubs Association|}

* The match ended 0–1, but Apollon Patras was zeroed for illegal usage of football players.

** Suspended at the 85th minute at the expense of Olympiacos Volos.

*** Suspended at the 80th minute at the expense of Kentavros Volos.

****Replay match.

Seventh round

|-
|colspan="5" style="background-color:#D0D0D0" align=center|Thessaly Football Clubs Association||colspan="2" rowspan="2" 

|-
|colspan="5" style="background-color:#D0D0D0" align=center|Thrace/Central-Eastern Macedonia Football Clubs Association||colspan="2" rowspan="2" 

|}

* Replay match.

**The match ended 0–1, but Ethnikos Sidirokastro was zeroed for illegal usage of football players.

Eighth round

|-
|colspan="3" style="background-color:#D0D0D0" align=center|Central Greece/Islands Football Clubs Association|-
|colspan="3" style="background-color:#D0D0D0" align=center|Thessaly Football Clubs Association|}

Ninth round

|-
|colspan="3" style="background-color:#D0D0D0" align=center|Central Greece/Islands Football Clubs Association|-
|colspan="3" style="background-color:#D0D0D0" align=center|Central Greece/Islands Football Clubs Association|-
|colspan="3" style="background-color:#D0D0D0" align=center|Euboea/Boeotia/Lamia Football Clubs Association|-
|colspan="3" style="background-color:#D0D0D0" align=center|Thessaly Football Clubs Association|-
|colspan="3" style="background-color:#D0D0D0" align=center|Thessaloniki Football Clubs Association|-
|colspan="3" style="background-color:#D0D0D0" align=center|Thrace/Central-Eastern Macedonia Football Clubs Association|}

* Suspended at the 54th minute due to rainfall while the score was 2–0. The match was replayed the next day.

**Suspended due to withdrawal of the referee.

Tenth round

|-
|colspan="5" style="background-color:#D0D0D0" align=center|Central Greece/Islands Football Clubs Association||colspan="2" rowspan="4" 

|-
|colspan="5" style="background-color:#D0D0D0" align=center|Thessaloniki Football Clubs Association||colspan="2" 
|-
|colspan="5" style="background-color:#D0D0D0" align=center|Thrace/Central-Eastern Macedonia Football Clubs Association||colspan="2" 

|}

*Replay match.

**The match ended 2–0, but Apollon Serres was zeroed for illegal usage of football players.

Eleventh round

|-
|colspan="3" style="background-color:#D0D0D0" align=center|Central Greece/Islands Football Clubs Association|-
|colspan="3" style="background-color:#D0D0D0" align=center|Thessaloniki Football Clubs Association|-
|colspan="3" style="background-color:#D0D0D0" align=center|Thrace/Central-Eastern Macedonia Football Clubs Association'''

|}

*Iraklis was disqualified as punishment of their footballers incident in a previous match.

Knockout phase
In the knockout phase, teams play against each other over a single match. If the match ends up as a draw, extra time will be played and if the match remains a draw a replay match is set at the home of the guest team which the extra time rule stands as well. That procedure will be repeated until a winner occurs. The mechanism of the draws for each round is as follows:
In the draw for the twelfth, the five top teams of each association are seeded and the eight clubs that passed the qualification round are unseeded.Three of the seeded teams are drawn against three of the unseeded teams. The rest three of the seeded times proceed to the quarter-finals while the remaining four of the unseeded teams are drawn against each other.
In the draws for the quarter-finals onwards, there are no seedings, and teams from the same group can be drawn against each other.

Bracket

Twelfth round

|}

Quarter-finals

||colspan="2" rowspan="3" 

|}

Semi-finals

|}

Final

The 6th Greek Cup Final was played at the Leoforos Alexandras Stadium.

References

External links
Greek Cup 1947-48 at RSSSF

Greek Football Cup seasons
Greek Cup
1947–48 in Greek football